The Ivorian records in swimming are the fastest ever performances of swimmers from Ivory Coast, which are recognised and ratified by the Federation Ivoirienne de Natation et de Sauvetage.

All records were set in finals unless noted otherwise.

Long Course (50 m)

Men

Women

Short Course (25 m)

Men

Women

References

Ivory Coast
Records
Swimming
Swimming